The Puducherry Legislative Assembly is the unicameral legislature of the Indian union territory (UT) of Puducherry, which comprises four districts: Puducherry, Karaikal, Mahé and Yanam. The legislative assembly has 30 seats, of which 5 are reserved for candidates from scheduled castes. Additionally 3 members are nominated by the Government of India. 30 out of 33 Members are elected directly by the people on the basis of universal adult franchise.

History 

In terms of the provisions of the Government of Union Territories Act, 1963 the normal tenure of the Assembly is five years, unless sooner dissolved. There are 16 Committees in the Assembly.

Parliamentary and assembly constituencies of Puducherry were redesigned by Delimitation Commission of India based on data obtained in 2001 census of India. On 4 January 2008, the Cabinet Committee on Political Affairs (CCPA) decided to implement the order from the Delimitation Commission. In addition, three members can be nominated to the assembly by the central government.

After 1963 Delimitation
As per The Union Territories Act, 1963, thirty members would be elected through direct suffrage.
Before the Elections to constitute the First Pondicherry Legislative Assembly were held in August 1964, the constituencies were delimited by the Delimitation Commission (as per Delimitation Commission Act, 1962) and the entire territory was divided into 30 single-member constituencies-21 for Pondicherry region, 6 for Karaikal region, 2 for Mahe region and 1 for Yanam region. Out of these 5 seats were reserved for Scheduled Castes, four in Pondicherry region and one in Karaikal region.

Before delimitation of 2008
The Puducherry Legislative Assembly has 30 constituencies. Out of them 21 constituencies belong to Puducherry, Karaikal has 6 in number, Mahé has 2 in number and Yanam has a single constituency.

Puducherry was divided among these 21 assembly constituencies: Muthialpet, Cassicade, Raj Bhavan, Bussy, Oupalam, Orleampeth, Nellithope, Modeliarpeth, Ariankuppam, Embalom (SC), Nettapakkam, Kuruvinatham, Bahour (SC), Thirubuvanai (SC), Mannadipeth, Ossudu (SC), Villenour, Ozhukarai, Thattanchavady, Reddiarpalayam and Lawspet.
 
Area under Karaikal district was divided among the following 6 assembly constituencies: Cotchery, Karaikal, Karaikal South, Neravy-Grand Alde, Tirunallar and Neduncadu (SC).

Assembly constituencies of Mahé and Palloor were from Mahé district. The Yanam district formed a single assembly constituency, i.e. Yanam.

After delimitation of 2008
Post delimitation, the Puducherry parliamentary constituencies is divided among 30 assembly constituencies, as before. Now, Yanam and Mahé districts form a single constituency each, viz Yanam and Mahé, respectively. The area under Karaikal district forms 5 assembly constituencies, viz Nedungadu, Thirunallar, Karaikal North, Karaikal South and Neravy T R Pattinam. The area under the Puducherry district forms 23 assembly constituencies, viz Mannadipet, Thirubuvanai, Ossudu, Mangalam, Villianur, Ozhukarai, Kadirkamam, Indira Nagar, Thattanchavady, Kamaraj Nagar, Lawspet, Kalapet, Muthialpet, Raj Bhavan, Oupalam, Orleampeth, Nellithope, Mudaliarpet, Ariankuppam, Manavely, Embalam, Nettapakkam and Bahour.

The constituencies of Thirubuvanai, Ossudu, Embalam, Nettapakkam and Nedungadu are reserved for candidates from SC.

List of constituencies

Following is the list of the constituencies of the Puducherry Legislative Assembly since the delimitation of legislative assembly constituencies in 2008. Out of the 30 constituencies, 23 belong to Puducherry, Karaikal has 5 constituencies, while Mahe and Yanam have a single constituency each. The constituencies of Thirubuvanai, Ossudu, Embalam, Nettapakkam and Nedungadu are reserved for candidates of the Scheduled Castes (SC).

See also 
 List of chief ministers of Puducherry
 List of speakers of the Puducherry Legislative Assembly

References 

Puducherry-related lists
Puducherry
Puducherry Legislative Assembly